Gangland killing is a euphemism  for a murder apparently connected to organized crime.

According to FBI Uniform Crime Reports, in 2013 there were 138 gangland killings or 1 percent of all homicides in the United States. This does not include juvenile gang killings, of which there were four times as many during the same year.

References

See also
 Organized crime
 Melbourne gangland killings
 Albert Anastasia
 FFF (gang)

Murder
Gangs
Gangland warfare tactics